Luiz dos Santos (born 5 April 1952) is a Brazilian rower. He competed in the men's coxed four event at the 1984 Summer Olympics.

References

1952 births
Living people
Brazilian male rowers
Olympic rowers of Brazil
Rowers at the 1984 Summer Olympics
Sportspeople from São Paulo